Ștefan Texe (born 29 June 1947) is a Romanian ice hockey player. He competed in the men's tournament at the 1968 Winter Olympics.

References

1947 births
Living people
Olympic ice hockey players of Romania
Ice hockey players at the 1968 Winter Olympics
People from Harghita County